The Chinese Ambassador to Niue is the official representative of the People's Republic of China to Niue.

List of representatives

See also
China–Niue relations

References 

Ambassadors of China to Niue
Niue